This was the first edition of the tournament.

Frederik Nielsen and Tim Pütz won the title after defeating Tomislav Draganja and Pavel Kotov 7–6(7–2), 6–0 in the final.

Seeds

Draw

References

External links
 Main draw

Tali Open - Doubles